Siegfried III may refer to:

 Siegfried III, Count of Weimar-Orlamünde (c.  1155 – 1206)
 Siegfried III (Archbishop of Mainz) (died in 1249)